A curtsy (also spelled curtsey or incorrectly as courtsey) is a traditional gendered gesture of greeting, in which a girl or woman bends her knees while bowing her head. In Western culture it is the feminine equivalent of bowing by males. Miss Manners characterizes its knee bend as deriving from a "traditional gesture of an inferior to a superior." The word "curtsy" is a phonological change from "courtesy" known in linguistics as syncope.

Overview
According to Desmond Morris, the motions involved in the curtsy and the bow were similar until the 17th century, and the sex differentiation between the actions developed afterwards. The earlier, combined version is still performed by Restoration comedy actors.

In more formal variants of the curtsy, the girl/woman bends the knees outward (rather than straight ahead), often sweeping one foot behind her. She may also use her hands to hold her skirt out from her body. In the Victorian era, when women wore floor-length, hooped skirts, they curtsied using the plié movement borrowed from second-position in classical ballet in which the knees are bent while the back is held straight. Both feet and knees point out so the torso lowers straight down. This way, the lady lowers herself evenly and not to one side.   

Traditionally, women and girls curtsy for those of senior social rank just as men and boys bow. Today this practice has become less common. In many European cultures it is traditional for women to curtsy in front of royalty. It may then be referred to as a court curtsy and is often especially deep and elaborate. Further, some female domestic workers curtsy for their employers. 

Female dancers often curtsy at the end of a performance to show gratitude or to acknowledge applause from the audience. At the end of a ballet class, students will also curtsy or bow to the teacher and pianist to show gratitude. According to Victorian dance etiquette, a woman curtsies before beginning a dance. Female Scottish highland dancers performing the national dances and the Irish jig also curtsy (at both the beginning and end for the national dances and at the end for the Irish jig). Some female ballroom dancers will curtsy to their partners before beginning the Viennese Waltz.  

In Victorian courts, the curtsy was done as a signal for courtship availability, and social status dominance or submissiveness, in order to be successful socially.

It is customary for female figure skaters to curtsy at the end of their performances at figure skating competitions or shows.

It is also common for female square dancers to curtsy as a method of greeting their male dance partners prior to the dance, while her partner bows. This square dancing practice is called "Honor your partner." Female cloggers also sometimes curtsy at the end of their performance. 

It is also acceptable in some cultures for the female to curtsy if wearing trousers or shorts.

During her coronation, Queen Elizabeth II performed a curtsy, or rather a half-curtsy, half-neck bow to King Edward's Chair.

During the funeral of Diana, Princess of Wales the Queen bowed her head in a half-curtsey as the Princess's coffin passed her.

The "Texas dip" is an extreme curtsy performed by a Texan debutante. The young woman slowly lowers her forehead towards the floor by crossing her ankles, then bending her knees and sinking. The escort's hand is held during the dip. When the debutante's head nears the floor, she turns her head sideways, averting the risk of soiling her dress with lipstick.

See also
 Partial squat

References

External links

The Lady's Courtesy in the Victorian Ballroom

Dance moves
Gestures
Gestures of respect
Bowing
Partial squatting position